Schöbel, Schobel, or Schoebel is a German surname. Notable people with this name include:

Aaron Schobel (born 1977), American football player
Alfred Schoebel (1911–2000), French swimmer
Anita Schöbel (born 1969), German mathematician
Charles Schoebel (1813–1888), French ethnologist, palaeographer and linguist
Elmer Schoebel (1896–1970), American jazz pianist
Frank Schöbel (born 1942), German pop singer
Franz Schöbel (born 1956), German cross-country skier
Gunter Schöbel (born 1959), German archaeologist
Jean-Pierre Schoebel (born 1949), French decathlete
Kurt Schöbel (born 1896), German sports shooter
Pierre Schoebel (born 1942), French hurdler
Simon Schobel (born 1950), Romanian handball player